"She Sure Got Away with My Heart" is a song written by Walt Aldridge and Tom Brasfield, and recorded by American country music artist John Anderson.  It was released in August 1984 as the second single from the album Eye of a Hurricane.  The song reached number 3 on the Billboard Hot Country Singles & Tracks chart.

Chart performance

References

1984 singles
John Anderson (musician) songs
Songs written by Walt Aldridge
Warner Records singles
Songs written by Tom Brasfield
1984 songs